Francis Yuk Lun Chin ) is an emeritus professor at the University of Hong Kong after having retired as professor of computer science and Taikoo Professor of Engineering at the University of Hong Kong. Chin served as head of the Computer Science Department from its start until 1999. In 2018, he and his wife founded a start-up named DeepTranslate Limited currently based in the Hong Kong Science and Technology Parks. DeepTranslate provides AI-assisted machine translation services, mainly for financial documents.

Academic career
Chin graduated from the University of Toronto in 1972 and received a doctorate from Princeton University in 1976. Before his appointment in Hong Kong, he held a variety of teaching positions in a number of universities in the US and Canada.

Chin was recruited to head the Computer Science Department at the University of Hong Kong. He is also the Managing Editor of the International Journal of the Foundations of Computer Science and is also a member of the editorial boards of a number of other journals.

In 1996, he was named a fellow of the IEEE.

Government service
Chin was the project leader for a study commissioned by a Select Committee of the Legislative Council of Hong Kong into the cause of delays to the start of operation of the new Hong Kong International Airport at Chep La Kok. In 2001, he was seconded to act as the interim CEO of the Hong Kong Domain Name Registration Company.

He has also served on a range of Hong Kong government committees including:
 the Innovation and Technology Fund Vetting Committee;
 a variety of committees on research grants and university funding committees ;
 the Information Infrastructure Advisory Committee of the information Technology and Broadcasting Committee; and
 the Promotion and Monitoring Sub-committee of the Quality Education Fund.

Research interests
Chin's interests include Bioinformatics, Computer Vision, the Design and Analysis of Algorithms
Motif-finding software packages
Security

Publications
Henry Leung and Francis Chin, "Finding Exact Optimal Motif in Matrix Representation by Partitioning", Proceedings of the 4th European Conference on Computational Biology (ECCB05), (Oct /Nov 2005) (accepted) also to be appeared in Bioinformatics
Henry Leung and Francis Y.L. Chin, "Generalized Planted (l,d)-Motif Problem with Negative Set", Proceedings of the 5th Workshop on Algorithms in Bioinformatics (WABI 2005), (October 2005) (accepted)
Francis Y.L. Chin and Henry C.M. Leung, "Voting Algorithms for Discovering Long Motifs", Proceedings of the Third Asia-Pacific Bioinformatics Conference (APBC2005), 261-271 (January 2005)
Francis Y.L. Chin, Qiangfeng Zhang and Hong Shen, "k-Recombination Haplotype Inference in Pedigrees", Proceedings of the 2005 International Workshop on Bioinformatics Research and Applications (in ICCS 2005), 985-993,(May 22–25, 2005)
Qiangfeng Zhang, Francis Y.L. Chin and Hong Shen, "Minimum Parent-Offspring Recombination Haplotype Inference in Pedigrees", LNCS Transactions on Computational Systems Biology (to appear)
Francis Y.L. Chin, N.L. Ho, T.W. Lam, and Prudence W.H. Wong, "Efficient Constrained Multiple Sequence Alignment with Performance Guarantee", Journal of Bioinformatics and Computational Biology, 3(1):1-18 (February 2005) - preliminary version appeared in CSB2003
F.Y.L. Chin, H.C.M. Leung, S.M.Yiu, T.W. Lam, R. Rosenfeld, W.W. Tsang, D.K. Smith, Y. Jiang, Finding Motifs for Insufficient Number of Sequences with Strong Binding to Transcription Factor, Proceedings of the 8th Annual International Conference on Research in Computational Molecular Biology (RECOMB 2004), Westin Hotel Horton Plaza, San Diego, CA USA, March 2004
W.T. Chan, F.Y.L. Chin, and H.F. Ting, Escaping a Grid by Edge-Disjoint Paths, Algorithmica 36:343-359, April 2003. Also appeared in the Proceedings of the Eleventh Annual ACM-SIAM Symposium on Discrete Algorithms (SODA'00), San Francisco, USA, January 2000
F.Y.L. Chin and S.P.Y. Fung, Online Scheduling with Partial Job Values: Does Timesharing or Randomization Help?, Algorithmica, 37:149-164, August 2003
F.Y.L. Chin and S.P.Y. Fung, Improved competitiveness algorithms for online scheduling with partial job values, The Ninth International Computing and Combinatorics Conference (COCOON 2003), Big Sky, MT, USA, pp. 425–434, July 2003

References

External links
 Hong Kong University people
 Homepage at HKU
 HKU ResearcherPage

Hong Kong scientists
Hong Kong educators
Chinese computer scientists
Year of birth missing (living people)
Living people
Princeton University alumni
Hong Kong expatriates in Canada
Fellow Members of the IEEE